Cardiotrophin-1 (CT-1) is a cytokine. It is a cardiac hypertrophic factor of 21.5 kDa and a protein member of the IL-6 cytokine family.

Pathology 
CT-1 is associated with the pathophysiology of heart diseases, including hypertension, myocardial infarction, valvular heart disease, and congestive heart failure.

Mode of action 
The protein exerts its cellular effects by interacting with the glycoprotein 130 (gp130)/leukemia inhibitory factor receptor beta (LIFR) heterodimer. In addition, CT-1 activates phosphatidylinositol 3-kinase (PI-3 kinase) in cardiac myocytes and enhances transcription factor NF-κB DNA -binding activities. 

CT-1 is highly expressed in the heart, skeletal muscle, prostate and ovary and to lower levels in lung, kidney, pancreas, thymus, testis and small intestine.

References

External links